Don't Tell the Wife is a 1927 American silent romantic comedy film directed by Paul L. Stein and starring Irene Rich, Huntley Gordon and Lilyan Tashman.

Cast
 Irene Rich as Mrs. Cartier  
 Huntley Gordon as Jacques Cartier  
 Lilyan Tashman as Suzanna  
 Otis Harlan as Magistrate 
 William Demarest as Ray Valerian 
 Margaret Gray as Frie

See also
List of early Warner Bros. sound and talking features

References

Bibliography
 John T. Weaver. Twenty Years of Silents, 1908-1928. Scarecrow Press, 1971.

External links

1927 films
American romantic comedy films
1927 romantic comedy films
Films directed by Paul L. Stein
American silent feature films
American films based on plays
Films based on works by Victorien Sardou
Warner Bros. films
American black-and-white films
1920s English-language films
1920s American films
Silent romantic comedy films
Silent American comedy films